Gary Chapman may refer to:

 Gary Chapman (author) (born 1938), author of the Five Love Languages series
 Gary Chapman (footballer, born 1964), English footballer
 Gary Chapman (musician) (born 1957), American singer/songwriter and former television talk show host
 Gary Chapman (swimmer) (1938–1978), Australian Olympic swimmer
 Gary Chapman (CPSR) (1952–2010), author, educator, activist and first executive director of Computer Professionals for Social Responsibility
 Gary Chapman (Australian footballer) (born 1955), former VFL player
 Gary Chapman (director) (born 1961), British artist, animator and film director